"Neighborhood #2 (Laïka)" is the second single by Canadian rock band Arcade Fire from their debut album Funeral. Released on 28 March 2005, the single reached number 30 on the UK Singles Chart, and was released on the Rough Trade Records record label. The single also contains the song "My Buddy" by Alvino Rey, the grandfather of Arcade Fire members Win and William Butler, which was previously featured on the band's debut single "Neighborhood #1 (Tunnels)".

When the song is performed at live shows, band members Will Butler and Richard Reed Parry usually take on percussion duties, often engaging in eccentric and sometimes violent acts while the rest of the band continue to perform.

Interpretation
The song, the second track on Funeral, is (according to Win Butler) about the Russian space program sending the dog Laika into space. Laika was the first living creature to orbit Earth. Butler told Pulse, a Minneapolis publication, "It’s a great story about a dog being the first living creature in space. Doing this spectacular thing, but not having food and watching itself fall back into the earth."

The song's dark lyrics complement its catchy melodies. The lyrics first tell the story of "Alexander" being sent out on an adventure. The adventure, for the "good of the neighborhood", will ultimately end in the death of "Alexander".

Track listings
"Neighborhood #2 (Laïka)" - 3:29
"My Buddy" (Alvino Rey Orchestra, live radio broadcast, 1940) - 2:32

Personnel
Win Butler - vocals, Jaguar Electric Guitar
Regine Chassagne - Vocals, accordion
Richard Reed Parry - percussion, synthesizer, engineer, recording
Tim Kingsbury - bass
Howard Bilerman - drums, Engineer, Recording
Will Butler - Percussion, xylophone
Additional musicians
Sarah Neufeld – violin, string arrangements
Owen Pallett – violin, string arrangements
Michael Olsen – cello
Pietro Amato – horn
Anita Fust – harp

References

External links
"' -"Neighborhood #2 Laïka" music video 
"" - Lyrics

Arcade Fire songs
2005 singles
2004 songs
Rough Trade Records singles
Songs written by William Butler (musician)
Songs written by Win Butler
Songs written by Régine Chassagne
Songs written by Tim Kingsbury
Songs written by Richard Reed Parry